Placement may refer to:

 Placement (EDA), an essential step in E-design automation
 Placement exam, determines which class a student should take
 Favored placement, the practice of preferentially listing search engine results for given sites
 Job placement, a short time spent with an employer to get work experience
 Private placement, a direct offering of securities to a limited number of sophisticated institutional investors
 Product placement, a promotional tactic used by marketers in which a real commercial product is used in fictional or non-fictional media
 Public placement, see Initial public offering

See also
 
 
 Emplacement (disambiguation)
 Place (disambiguation)